Mouchette.org is an interactive website created in 1996 by a pseudonymous character, an Amsterdam-based artist who calls herself "Mouchette." With her innocent salutation and claims to be "nearly thirteen" greeting the visitor from the introduction page, what initially appears as a personal website of an underage female artist evolves into darker themes in the subsequent pages.

Mouchette is loosely based on a 1937 book by Georges Bernanos and the 1967 Robert Bresson movie. The storyline is about a French teenager who commits suicide after she is raped. An online quiz comparing the "Neo-Mouchette" to the movie angered Bresson's widow, so she threatened a lawsuit against the artist behind the project. The quiz was taken down after that incident. It is currently available and is hosted by other websites as a protest against abusive copyright laws.

The website creator was a closely guarded secret for a long time. Still, eventually, the piece was claimed by artist Martine Neddam. When creating the page, she was 18 and suffered from depression. Neddam has since made a page where she explains Mouchette.org and occasionally shares its secrets.

Apart from being a taboo subject, the manipulation of cyber identity and the Neddam's ability to maintain anonymity for so long are the significant reasons why this website has garnered an "international reputation." Especially in the Internet art community.

Summary and themes

This "deceptively innocent" introduction, which appears next to a portrait of a "sad eyed" adolescent girl on the main page with a floral background, is in stark contrast to the complexity of the rest of the site.

The webpage consists of interactive texts, secret links, and "poems that reveal the multiple faces of the artist, along with her fears and obsessions." The whole impression is that it is a work of a more mature person than a 13-year-old girl.

Suicide, death, and violence
Just like the film Mouchette, one of the themes running throughout Mouchette.org is the idea of death. The recurring image of a fly is present on many of the pages. The word "mouchette" translates into English as "little fly." Comparable lives of the Mouchettes – the fly and the girl – intersect when they revolve around the fly's death.

On one page, Mouchette refers to herself as the fly and blames the web visitor for killing her when they pressed a button on the previous webpage. On another page, sad music plays as the "lullaby for a dead fly" is shown on the screen.

As stated in the Internet Art book, "in early iterations of the site, the virtual persona Mouchette was obsessed with suicide." One page asks the viewer what they think is the best way to kill yourself when you're under 13. On a page entitled m.org.ue, an image of feet is shown, with one foot wearing a toe tag while ghostly music plays.

When a link called "meet my parent" is clicked, it directs to a page that has scanned images of meat with the words "Papa" and "Maman" carved in it. On one page, a picture of a cat violently shakes on the screen while sounds of screaming are playing; the viewer is asked to kill the cat.

Sex
"Sexually suggestive" themes are present throughout the site. On the opening page of the section named "***digital flesh&blood***," the background image is of a close-up of a young girl's face, sticking out her tongue. The image's text reads: "Want to know what my tongue tastes like? Try it on your screen and tell me."

Another page, titled "touché," has an entirely black background, with tiny white words scattered throughout the page. As the pointer scrolls over specific points on the page, the sounds of a woman gasping are activated.

Many pages of this website have interactive web forms that include multiple-choice questions asking your email address. Days or weeks later, the viewer might get unexpected flirtatious email messages from Mouchette.

Manipulating identity
Visitors are allowed to "become Mouchette" when they become members of the "Mouchette Network." Members can "create true Mouchette webpages" and are given "a unique opportunity to become a great artist."

The interactive questionnaires often will ask you to post your name and email address if you answer one of the questions. But the anonymity of the creator and the unsettling topics make a participant wonder how seriously they should answer the questions, including a question about their name and identity.

Some time later, participants will get a random email from Mouchette. This will often be unsettling because it's random and unexpected, leaving the participant questioning their identity/decision to personal input information from the website.

The website's exploration of manipulating identity has been compared to the conceptual photographer Cindy Sherman.

Criticism and controversy
With its taboo subject matter, Mouchette.org has "provoked heated reaction" in the art community. An interactive forum allowed participants to state why they hate Mouchette.

In an early version of Mouchette.org, a quiz compared web persona Mouchette and the lead character in Bresson's film Mouchette. Images taken from the film were used in this quiz. In 2002, the Bresson estate threatened legal action against the Mouchette.org author. Subsequently, the French Society of Dramatic Authors and Composers banned the content.

According to academic Toni Sant from Salford University, "this copyright issue raises the question of ownership over fictional identities...and raises issues of originality and ownership." Nevertheless, the censorship case increased interest in the Mouchette.org project.

After the quiz was removed from Mouchette.org, other websites hosted copies as a protest. The quiz source code distributor blamed the heirs for censoring the work that was a de facto homage to Bresson's movie.

In 2017, the original quiz was restored.

References

External links
 mouchette.org
 ||| My Quiz |||

Net.artists
Computer art
Digital art